Isla Mary Bevan (née Foster; 26 October 1908 – 19 July 1976) was a British stage and film actress from Peckham, London.

Selected filmography
 Nine till Six (1932)
 The Sign of Four (1932)
 The Face at the Window (1932)
 The World, the Flesh, the Devil (1932)
 Puppets of Fate (1933)
 Fair Exchange (1936)

References

External links

1908 births
1976 deaths
People from Newport, Isle of Wight
English film actresses
English stage actresses
20th-century English actresses
Actresses from London
People from Peckham